The Miss Hong Kong Pageant 2021 was the 49th Miss Hong Kong Pageant that was held on September 12, 2021.  Miss Hong Kong 2020 winner Lisa-Marie Tse crowned the new Miss Hong Kong 2021 winner, Sabina Mendes de Assunção (宋宛穎), at the end of the pageant. Her official name is Sabina, but she goes by Sabrina.

The official recruitment process took place from May 10, 2021, to June 6, 2021. The semifinal took place on August 22, 2021, with the final taking place on 12 September 2021. The slogan of the pageant is "We Miss Hong Kong". 28 delegates competed for the title.

Results 

Placements

Special Awards

 Wai Yin Association Charity Award: #20 Katerina Leung
Miss Friendship: #14 Kristy Shaw
 Miss Photogenic: #10 Penny Yeung
The following awards were given during sponsor or promotion event:

 E.A. Beauty Master: #15 Carina Leung, #17 Trixie Yu, Christie Chang and Nicole Ma
 Treasure Hunt Winners: #2 Rachel Chan, #3 Yvette Chan, #5 Michelle Cheung, #7 Fiona Dai and #12 Michelle Ip
 Healthy Vitality: #7 Fiona Dai
 Fitness Posture: #13 Cathy Wong
 Top 20 Audience Most Like Contestant: #3 Yvette Chan and #9 Anna Wang (tie)
 Sasa Beauty Master: #4 Fabienne Kwan and #8 Sabina Mendes de Assunção
 Sasa Beauty Story Award: #13 Cathy Wong, #14 Kristy Shaw, #15 Carina Leung, #18 Vincy Mok, #19 Jasmin Schneider and #20 Katerina Leung
 Top 12 Audience Most Like Contestant: #4 Fabienne Kwan

Contestants 

There are 28 Miss Hong Kong 2021 contestants. The 28 delegates were narrowed to 20 at the conclusion of the We Miss Hong Kong STAY-cation reality series. The Semi-Final competition was held on August 22, 2021, to further narrow down to 12 contestants ahead of the Finals on September 12, 2021.

We Miss Hong Kong STAY-cation 

In 2021, a new reality-TV style show called "We Miss Hong Kong STAY-cation" was broadcast on TVB for 2 weeks from August 9 to 19. The contestants were split into four teams to be mentored by past Miss Hong Kong winners: Pink Team mentored by Sandy Lau (Miss Hong Kong 2009) and Sammi Cheung (Miss Hong Kong 2010 1st Runner Up), Red Team mentored by Mandy Cho (Miss Hong Kong 2003) and Regina Ho (Miss Hong Kong 2017 1st Runner Up), Green Team mentored by Anne Heung (Miss Hong Kong 1998) and Rebecca Zhu (Miss Hong Kong 2011) and Orange Team mentored by Kayi Cheung (Miss Hong Kong 2007) Crystal Fung (Miss Hong Kong 2016). Like many other reality-TV shows, contestants are eliminated on a regular basis. 

† Indicates eliminated contestant

Elimination chart

Judges
Main Judging Panel:
 Mr. Lawrence Yu Kam-kee, SBS, JP
 Ms. Loletta Chu, Miss Hong Kong 1977
 Ms. Michelle Ong
 Mr. Lam Tai-fai, SBS, JP
 Mr. Andrew Lau

Miss Photogenic judging panel:
 Mr. Alan Chan
 Ms. Kathy Chow
 Ms. Sofie Rahman, Miss Hong Kong 1995 First runner-up and Miss Photogenic
 Mr. Ringo Tang

References

External links 

 Official Website

Miss Hong Kong Pageants
2021 in Hong Kong
Hong Kong